The Canada men's national under-17 basketball team represents Canada in international under-16 and under-17 (under age 16 and under age 17) basketball competitions. They are overseen by Canada Basketball, the governing body for basketball in Canada.

Prominent members have been RJ Barrett, Simisola Shittu and Ignas Brazdeikis who all played at the 2016 FIBA Under-17 World Championship under coach David DeAveiro.

Competitive record

FIBA Under-17 World Cup

See also
Canada men's national basketball team
Canada national under-19 basketball team
Canada women's national under-17 basketball team

References

External links

Archived records of Canada team participations

under
Men's national under-17 basketball teams